Lyonetia pulverulentella is a moth in the  family Lyonetiidae. It is found from central Europe eastward into Russia and Ukraine. It was recently reported from British Columbia, Canada.

Adults are on wing from May to September.

The larvae feed on Salix species. They mine the leaves of their host plant.

References

External links
Swedish Moths and Butterflies
Fauna Europaea
A Review of the Lyonetiid Moths (Lepidoptera, Lyonetiidae): II. The Subfamilies Lyonetiinae and Bedelliinae

Lyonetiidae
Moths of Europe